Lauri Tilkanen (born 6 November 1987) is a Finnish actor. He has appeared on television and in films such as Skavabölen pojat (2009), Paha perhe (2010), Hiljaisuus (2011), Härmä (2012) and Juoppohullun päiväkirja (2012). He studied at the Helsinki Theatre Academy and graduated in 2012.

Tilkanen was in a relationship with actress Pamela Tola since 2011. Tola gave birth to their son in March 2013. They married in 2015. They got divorced in June 2020.

Selected filmography

In films

Skavabölen pojat (2009)
Paha perhe (2009)
Ei kenenkään maa (2009)
 Hiljaisuus (2011)
Härmä (2012)
Juoppohullun päiväkirja (2012)
Wildeye (2015)
Reunion (2015)
Syysprinssi (2016)
Tom of Finland (2017)
Teräsleidit / Ladies of Steel (2020)

On television

Nymphs (2014)
Syke (2014)
Tellus (2014)
Deadwind (2018)
Hotel Swan Helsinki (2020)

References

External links

1987 births
Living people
People from Pöytyä
Finnish male film actors